Kylstad or Kylstadfeltet is a village in Ringsaker Municipality in Innlandet county, Norway.

References

Ringsaker
Villages in Innlandet